Greenville Creek is a  tributary of the Stillwater River in southwestern Ohio in the United States. Via the Stillwater River, the Great Miami River, and the Ohio River, its water flows to the Mississippi River and ultimately the Gulf of Mexico.  The creek starts in extreme eastern Indiana in Randolph County. It soon flows into Darke County, Ohio, and joins with a tributary that also starts in Indiana, Dismal Creek. It flows through Greenville and Gettysburg before entering Miami County. Near its confluence with the Stillwater River at Covington it drops  at Greenville Falls in a glacially-cut gorge that is a state nature preserve.

A USGS stream gauge on the creek near Bradford recorded a mean annual discharge of  during water years 1931–2019.

See also
List of rivers of Indiana
List of rivers of Ohio

References 

Rivers of Ohio
Rivers of Indiana
Rivers of Randolph County, Indiana
Rivers of Miami County, Ohio